Třebětín is a municipality and village in Kutná Hora District in the Central Bohemian Region of the Czech Republic. It has about 100 inhabitants.

Administrative parts
Villages of Hostkovice and Víckovice are administrative parts of Třebětín.

References

Villages in Kutná Hora District